Dan Alexa (born 28 October 1979) is a Romanian professional football manager and former player.

As a defensive midfielder, he spent 16 years as a professional player.

After he ended his playing career, Alexa became a manager. His first job was at ACS Poli Timișoara, in March 2014. Since 23 August 2017 he was manager of Dunărea Călărași until summer of 2019. Then he was named manager of Astra Giurgiu.

Club career

Early career
Although born in Banat, Alexa was considered disposable while at UM Timișoara in 1998, and he moved to Rocar București where he helped his side reach the 2000–01 Romanian Cup final.

Dinamo București
After several years with short spells at FC Timișoara and Universitatea Craiova, Alexa got his big chance as Dinamo București decided to transfer him. His performances were of a high caliber throughout the two seasons he spent there, but he also got a reputation for being an extremely aggressive player. In two years, he scored 1 goal in 47 appearances.

Beijing Hyundai
His consequent move to Beijing Hyundai saw him leave Romania for two years. In a friendly match against Real Madrid he was selected man of the match.

Dinamo București
He returned to Dinamo in 2006 just for a few months playing 13 matches, scoring one goal.

Politehnica Timișoara
In the summer of the same year, Politehnica boss Marian Iancu decided to bring Alexa – by then, a real "persona non-grata" in Timișoara, due to his pledge of loyalty to Dinamo – back to the city where he started his career, together with teammate Ştefan Grigorie. The fans protested at Alexa's arrival in Timișoara through several banners and chants, but the club's management remained unimpressed. Alexa himself stated that he had made those statements out of necessity and that he will do all he can to prove to the fans that he is a real professional. A few months after his arrival, Alexa became the captain of Poli. He is nicknamed "the surgeon" because he inflicted many injuries requiring surgery to opposing players. On 19 April 2010, he scored the equaliser goal in the 98th minute against CFR Cluj and kept Poli in the battle for the title, however Poli finished 5th, losing their last three matches.

Rapid București
On 4 June 2011, the former captain of Politehnica Timișoara signed a two-year contract with Rapid București following the relegation of Poli.

Anorthosis Famagusta
On 24 June 2012, Dan Alexa signed with the Cyprus First Division football club, Anorthosis Famagusta, on a free transfer. He signed a reported €250,000/yr contract with the club.

International career
Alexa was first called up by the national team in 2004. Later in 2010, he was called up for a friendly match against Italy after a six-year absence. Alexa scored his first goals for Romania in a 2–2 draw against Ukraine at Cyprus International Cup 2011. However, Romania were eliminated from the tournament, after losing on penalty kicks 4–2.

International stats

International goals

Honours

Player
UM Timișoara
Divizia C: 1998–99
Dinamo București
Divizia A: 2003–04
Romanian Cup: 2002–03, 2003–04

Coach
ACS Poli Timișoara
Liga II: 2014–15
Rapid București
Liga II: 2015–16
Dunărea Călărași
Liga II: 2017–18
CSM Reșița
Liga III: 2021–22

Managerial statistics

References

External links

1979 births
People from Caransebeș
Living people
Romanian footballers
Romania international footballers
Romania under-21 international footballers
Association football midfielders
AFC Rocar București players
FC Politehnica Timișoara players
FC U Craiova 1948 players
FC Dinamo București players
Beijing Guoan F.C. players
FC Rapid București players
Anorthosis Famagusta F.C. players
Liga I players
Cypriot First Division players
Chinese Super League players
Romanian expatriate footballers
Expatriate footballers in China
Expatriate footballers in Cyprus
Romanian expatriate sportspeople in China
Romanian expatriate sportspeople in Cyprus
Romanian football managers
ACS Poli Timișoara managers
ASA 2013 Târgu Mureș managers
CS Concordia Chiajna managers
FC Dunărea Călărași managers
FC Astra Giurgiu managers
FC Rapid București managers
SSU Politehnica Timișoara managers
CSM Reșița managers
FC Brașov (2021) managers